The first season of the American television drama series Masters of Sex premiered on September 29, 2013 and concluded on December 15, 2013. It consists of twelve episodes, each running for approximately 55 minutes in length. Showtime broadcast the first season on Sundays at 10:00 pm (ET) in the United States. Internationally, the season aired in Canada on The Movie Network concurrently with the American broadcast, and it debuted in the UK on Channel 4 on October 8, 2013.

The series was developed for television by Michelle Ashford and is based on the biography Masters of Sex: The Life and Times of William Masters and Virginia Johnson, the Couple Who Taught America How to Love by Thomas Maier. Masters of Sex tells the story of Dr. William Masters (Michael Sheen) and Virginia Johnson (Lizzy Caplan), two pioneering researchers of human sexuality at Washington University in St. Louis. The first season takes place between 1956 and 1958.

Cast

Main
 Michael Sheen as Dr. William Masters (12 episodes)
 Lizzy Caplan as Virginia Johnson (12 episodes)
 Caitlin FitzGerald as Libby Masters (11 episodes)
 Teddy Sears as Dr. Austin Langham (8 episodes)
 Nicholas D'Agosto as Dr. Ethan Haas (11 episodes)

Recurring

Guests
 Margo Martindale as Miss Horchow (1 episode)

Production
Showtime ordered the pilot for Masters of Sex in August 2011, and greenlit it for series in June 2012, with the first season consisting of twelve episodes.

Writer/producer Michelle Ashford serves as showrunner for Masters of Sex. She assembled a majority-female writing staff, although she says this was unintentional.

Ashford created the character of Barton Scully out of a combination of several men whom Masters knew. One of them was gay, but was not the man serving as Provost during Masters's initial study.

Prop master Jeffrey Johnson noted the difficulty of obtaining accurate information about sexual devices from the time period. "They were so taboo it was hard to find research drawings. People didn’t even put them in writing." He obtained some vintage vibrators and dildos for use in the series along with acquiring condoms manufactured in the era (which did not have the reservoir tips of modern condoms). He designed "Ulysses," a transparent dildo with attached camera first seen in the pilot episode, from scratch, along with a diaphragm sizing kit seen in later episodes.

Episodes

Reception

Reviews
The first season of Masters of Sex has received acclaim from critics. Based on 49 reviews collected by Rotten Tomatoes, the first season received a 90% approval rating from critics, with a rating average of 8.4 out of 10. The sites consensus states: "Seductive and nuanced, Masters of Sex features smart performances, deft direction, and impeccable period decor." Metacritic gave the first season a score of 85/100, based on 32 reviews.

Matt Roush of TV Guide wrote that "There is no more fascinating, or entertaining, new series this fall season." Diane Werts of Newsday gave it an "A" grade, complimenting the series on its use of humor, stating "its deft balance of epic scope and whimsical humanity", as well as the strong performances of the actors and creator Michelle Ashford's "scene-setting scripts". David Wiegand of the San Francisco Chronicle particularly praises the performances, calling them "extraordinary" and "stunning", and noting the series' A-list directors such as Michael Apted and John Madden. Hank Stuever of The Washington Post wrote that after the first two episodes, "the characters get better and more complex, the story builds, strange things start to happen and now I can't wait to see how its interweaving plots unfold. Alan Sepinwall of HitFix praised lead actors Michael Sheen and Lizzy Caplan, calling them "terrific", and that "Masters of Sex is the best new show of the fall by a very long stretch. It's also a refreshing anomaly: a prestige cable drama that doesn't feel like a recombination of elements from 15 shows that came before it."

Accolades
 
In June 2013, the series was honored, along with five others, with the Critics' Choice Television Award for Most Exciting New Series. The series received two nominations for the 2014 Writers Guild of America Awards, for Best New Series and Best Episodic Drama for "Pilot".  For the 71st Golden Globe Awards, the series was nominated for Best Drama Series, and Michael Sheen was nominated Best Drama Actor. For the 4th Critics' Choice Television Awards, the series received nominations for Best Drama Series, Michael Sheen for Best Actor in a Drama Series, Lizzy Caplan for Best Actress is a Drama Series, Beau Bridges for Best Guest Performer in a Drama Series, with Allison Janney winning for Best Guest Performer in a Drama Series. For the 66th Primetime Emmy Awards, Lizzy Caplan was nominated for Outstanding Lead Actress in a Drama Series, Beau Bridges was nominated for Outstanding Guest Actor in a Drama Series, and Allison Janney won for Outstanding Guest Actress in a Drama Series.

Home media releases

References

External links
 

2013 American television seasons
Fiction set in 1956
Fiction set in 1957
Fiction set in 1958